Du har lovet mig en kone! is a 1935 Norwegian comedy film written by Tancred Ibsen, and co-directed by Ibsen and Einar Sissener, starring Sissener, Randi Brænne and Kirsten Heiberg.

References

External links
 
 

1935 films
1935 comedy-drama films
Norwegian comedy-drama films
Norwegian black-and-white films
Films directed by Tancred Ibsen
Films directed by Einar Sissener